Luciano Sgheiz (born 20 December 1941) was an Italian rower.

Sgheiz was born in Colico in 1941. Romano Sgheiz (born 1937) is his brother. He competed for Italy in the 1964 European Rowing Championships in Amsterdam in the coxless four competition where he won a bronze medal. The same team competed two months later in the coxless four at the 1964 Summer Olympics where they came fifth. He then competed in the coxed four at the 1968 Summer Olympics where they came fourth.

References

1941 births
Living people
Italian male rowers
Rowers at the 1964 Summer Olympics
Rowers at the 1968 Summer Olympics
Olympic rowers of Italy
People from Colico
European Rowing Championships medalists
Sportspeople from the Province of Lecco